Martin Purtscher (12 November 1928 – 27 January 2023) was an Austrian politician.

Purtscher died on 27 January 2023, at the age of 94.

References

1928 births
2023 deaths
Austrian People's Party politicians
Governors of Vorarlberg
Recipients of the Austrian Cross of Honour for Science and Art, 1st class
Grand Crosses with Star and Sash of the Order of Merit of the Federal Republic of Germany
Recipients of the Order of Merit of Baden-Württemberg
Knights Grand Cross of the Order of St Gregory the Great
People from Bludenz District